Stuart Ritchie may refer to:
 Stuart J. Ritchie, Scottish psychologist and science communicator
 Stuart Ritchie (footballer), English footballer and football manager 
 Stuart Ritchie (soccer), American soccer player